Filipe Luís Kasmirski (born 9 August 1985), known as Filipe Luís, is a Brazilian professional footballer who plays as a left back for Flamengo.

A player of tireless approach also known for his tactical awareness, he spent most of his early professional career in Spain, beginning at Deportivo where he spent four seasons. In 2010 he joined Atlético Madrid, and won four trophies including the La Liga championship in 2014. He signed with Chelsea in July of that year for £15.8 million, helping them to both the Premier League and the League Cup, but lack of game time in London saw him return to Atlético a year later, winning the Europa League and Super Cup in his second spell (both in 2018). He then joined Brazilian giants Flamengo as a free agent, where he won a number of honours including the Campeonato Brasilero in 2019, 2020, and the Copa Libertadores also in 2019.

Filipe Luís made his debut for Brazil in 2009 and went on to earn over 40 caps, representing the nation at the 2013 Confederations Cup, three Copas América and the 2018 World Cup, winning the Confederations Cup as well as the 2019 Copa América.

Club career

Early years
Filipe Luís was born in Jaraguá do Sul, Santa Catarina. Coming from Figueirense FC as an attacking midfielder, he had his first taste of European football with AFC Ajax in 2004, spending one full season in the Beloften Eredivisie with the reserves. He was called up for the first team twice by manager Danny Blind for an Eredivisie match against FC Den Bosch and a UEFA Cup game against AJ Auxerre, but remained on the bench for both fixtures. Despite never playing a competitive match, he credited the Dutch club for helping him learn tactical aspects of the game, as well as aiding his development by allowing him to train with players such as Rafael van der Vaart and Wesley Sneijder.

Afterwards, Filipe Luís was registered under C.A. Rentistas, who had a partnership with his agent Juan Figer. In August 2005 he was loaned to Real Madrid, spending the entire season with its B team in Segunda División; the move was not made subsequently permanent, after high financial requests from the Uruguayan club.

Deportivo

Filipe Luís joined Deportivo de La Coruña in August 2006, with a buyout clause of $2.2 million. He did not have many opportunities in his first season, but his loan was extended for a further year with the same buy-out clause. In 2007–08, after first-choice Joan Capdevila's departure to Villarreal CF, he went on to establish himself as first-choice left-back.

On 10 June 2008, Filipe Luís was purchased and signed a five-year contract. During his debut season as a Deportivo player, he was the only outfield player in La Liga to appear in all 38 league games, scoring twice.

On 23 January 2010, immediately after netting the first in a league game against Athletic Bilbao (an eventual 3–1 home win), Filipe Luís sustained a horrific injury to his right fibula after opposing goalkeeper Gorka Iraizoz landed on his leg – again, he had played all matches and minutes during the campaign, and the side stood fourth in the table. Amazingly, he returned to action just four months later, appearing in the second half of the 1–0 home victory over RCD Mallorca and being involved in the play which led to Riki's goal; the Galicians would eventually finish in the tenth position.

Atlético Madrid

On 23 July 2010, Filipe Luís signed for five years with Atlético Madrid for an undisclosed fee, reported to have reached €12 or 13.5 million. His official debut came on 26 September at home against Real Zaragoza, where he set up compatriot Diego Costa for the game's only goal, receiving Player of the match accolades.

In his first season, Filipe Luís constantly fought for first-choice status with youth graduate Antonio López. On 10 April 2011, he scored his first goal for the team in a 3–0 home win over Real Sociedad. On 17 January 2013, he netted the second in a 2–0 defeat of Real Betis in the Copa del Rey, and also played the full 90 minutes in the final of the latter competition against Real Madrid, which ended with a 2–1 triumph at the Santiago Bernabéu Stadium.

Filipe Luís made his first appearances in the UEFA Champions League in the 2013–14 edition, helping the Colchoneros secure first place in Group G by scoring once in a 4–0 home rout of FK Austria Wien. During the league campaign, he was part of a stellar backline that only conceded 26 goals in 38 games as Atlético won the league title for the first time in 18 years. Additionally, he took part in ten matches in the Champions League, including the 1–4 final loss to Real Madrid in Lisbon, being subsequently voted the best defender in the Spanish League alongside teammate Miranda and Real Madrid's Sergio Ramos.

Chelsea
On 16 July 2014, Chelsea and Atlético agreed a fee of £15.8 million for the transfer of Filipe Luís, subject to personal terms. The player ultimately signed a three-year contract two days later, stating upon his arrival, "This move is a dream come true for me. I now have the opportunity to play for Chelsea, and also in the Premier League. I'm very happy and looking forward to getting started and giving my best for the team during the coming seasons."

Filipe Luís made his debut in a pre-season friendly against Wolfsberger AC, on 23 July 2014. His squad number was confirmed as 3, replacing Ashley Cole who had just moved to A.S. Roma. In his new team's first match of the league season, away to Burnley, he was an unused substitute, with César Azpilicueta playing at left back; he later expressed that he was content to be second choice behind his teammate if they were playing well, comparing his situation to the team's experienced goalkeeper Petr Čech, who had been benched for Thibaut Courtois.

Filipe Luís made his league debut in the third round, featuring the last seven minutes of a 6–3 win at Everton in place of Eden Hazard on 30 August 2014. He started for the first time on 17 September, playing the entirety of a 1–1 home draw against FC Schalke 04 in the first group stage game; with Azpilicueta suspended, he received his first start on 26 October, a 1–1 draw away to Manchester United.

Filipe Luís' only goal for the Blues came on 16 December 2014, a 25-yard free-kick in a 3–1 victory at Derby County in the quarter-finals of the League Cup. Azpilicueta, however, played at left-back in the final of the competition, won 2–0 against Tottenham Hotspur. On 3 May 2015, he came on as an added-time substitute for Hazard in a 1–0 home win over Crystal Palace which secured the league title.

On 21 July 2015, manager José Mourinho confirmed that Filipe Luís would be leaving Stamford Bridge after only one year.

Return to Atlético

On 28 July 2015, Filipe Luís re-joined Atlético Madrid on a four-year deal for an undisclosed fee. He made his return to the team on 22 August as they opened the season with a 1–0 home victory against newly promoted UD Las Palmas. In the 3–0 win in the reverse fixture the following 17 January, he scored his first goal since returning.

On 30 January 2016, Filipe Luís was sent off in the first half of a 1–2 loss at FC Barcelona for a challenge on Lionel Messi, and teammate Diego Godín was later also dismissed. The duo escaped criticism by manager Diego Simeone, but Filipe Luís was subsequently handed a three-match ban. He continued being an undisputed starter during his spell at the Vicente Calderón Stadium.

In March 2018, after a collision with FC Lokomotiv Moscow's Eder in a Europa League tie, Filipe Luís broke the fibula in his left leg, initially being thought to miss the rest of the season and thus the 2018 FIFA World Cup but making a recovery in two months. He ended his second stint at Atlético upon the expiration of his contract, on 30 June 2019.

Flamengo
On 23 July 2019, Filipe Luís returned to Brazil and signed a two-and-a-half-year contract with Flamengo.

International career

On 7 August 2009, Filipe Luís was called up by Brazil for the first time, replacing injured Marcelo for a friendly against Estonia but eventually not leaving the bench in the 1–0 away win, on 12 August. He made his debut in a 2010 FIFA World Cup qualifier against Venezuela, on 15 October.

Filipe Luís was selected in the squad which won the 2013 FIFA Confederations Cup on home soil, although he did not enter the field during the competition. He was one of seven players put on standby for the 2014 World Cup, but did not make the final cut.

On 11 October 2014, in that year's Superclásico de las Américas in Beijing, Filipe Luís played the entirety of a 2–0 victory against Argentina. With Marcelo absent through injury, he played every minute of their campaign at the 2015 Copa América in Chile, which ended in the quarter-finals.

On 17 November 2015, Filipe Luís scored his first goal for Brazil in a 3–0 defeat of Peru for the 2018 World Cup qualification held in Salvador, Bahia. In May 2018, he was named in Tite's 23-man squad for the finals in Russia, making his debut in the competition on 27 June when he replaced the injured Marcelo in the early minutes of the 2–0 group stage win against Serbia.

In May 2019, Filipe Luís was included in the 23-man squad for the 2019 Copa América on home soil. In the quarter-final match against Paraguay on 27 June, he was replaced by Alex Sandro at half-time after suffering an injury, as his team advanced to the next stage after winning 4–3 on penalties; they subsequently went on to win the title, following a 3–1 win over Peru in the final at the Maracanã Stadium.

Personal life
All four of Filipe Luís' grandparents were European immigrants, who came to Santa Catarina. His paternal grandfather left Poland during World War I. He is also of Italian ancestry.

In 2014, Filipe Luís' second child, a daughter named Sara, was born. He also fathered a son the previous year, Tiago.

Career statistics

Club

International

International goals
 (Brazil score listed first, score column indicates score after each Filipe Luís goal)

Honours

Atlético Madrid
La Liga: 2013–14
Copa del Rey: 2012–13
UEFA Europa League: 2011–12, 2017–18
UEFA Super Cup: 2012, 2018
UEFA Champions League runner-up: 2013–14, 2015–16

Chelsea
Premier League: 2014–15
Football League Cup: 2014–15

Flamengo
Copa Libertadores: 2019, 2022
Recopa Sudamericana: 2020
Campeonato Brasileiro Série A: 2019, 2020
 Copa do Brasil: 2022
Supercopa do Brasil: 2020, 2021
Campeonato Carioca: 2020, 2021
FIFA Club World Cup runner-up: 2019

Brazil U20
FIFA World Youth Championship third place: 2005

Brazil
Copa América: 2019
FIFA Confederations Cup: 2013

Individual
La Liga Team of the Season: 2013–14
FIFPro World XI: Fifth Team 2014
ESM Team of the Season: 2015–16
UEFA La Liga Team of The Season: 2015–16, 2016–17
Campeonato Brasileiro Série A Team of the Year: 2019
Campeonato Carioca Team of the Year: 2020, 2021

References

External links

Atlético Madrid official profile 

Deportivo archives

1985 births
Living people
Sportspeople from Santa Catarina (state)
Brazilian people of Italian descent
Brazilian people of Polish descent
Citizens of Italy through descent
Brazilian footballers
Association football defenders
Campeonato Brasileiro Série A players
Figueirense FC players
CR Flamengo footballers
Jong Ajax players
AFC Ajax players
C.A. Rentistas players
La Liga players
Segunda División players
Real Madrid Castilla footballers
Deportivo de La Coruña players
Atlético Madrid footballers
Premier League players
Chelsea F.C. players
UEFA Europa League winning players
Brazil youth international footballers
Brazil under-20 international footballers
Brazil international footballers
2013 FIFA Confederations Cup players
2015 Copa América players
Copa América Centenario players
2018 FIFA World Cup players
2019 Copa América players
Copa América-winning players
Copa Libertadores-winning players
FIFA Confederations Cup-winning players
Brazilian expatriate footballers
Expatriate footballers in the Netherlands
Expatriate footballers in Uruguay
Expatriate footballers in Spain
Expatriate footballers in England
Brazilian expatriate sportspeople in the Netherlands
Brazilian expatriate sportspeople in Uruguay
Brazilian expatriate sportspeople in Spain
Brazilian expatriate sportspeople in England